The Berleman House is a historic house located at 115 S. Main St. in Edwardsville, Illinois. The house was built between 1864 and 1868 by Samual Morrison. Architect Charles Spillman designed the house in the Greek Revival style. The house is a one-story brick building topped by a gable roof. The front entrance features a pediment supported by Doric pilasters; smaller pillars flank the recessed door, which has sidelights and a transom. Carpenter Herman Berleman purchased the house in 1868; his family lived in the home until 1962. In 1895, Berleman built a frame addition on the back of the house.

The house was added to the National Register of Historic Places on March 27, 1980.

References

Houses on the National Register of Historic Places in Illinois
Greek Revival houses in Illinois
Houses completed in 1868
National Register of Historic Places in Madison County, Illinois
Houses in Madison County, Illinois
1868 establishments in Illinois